The Ipswich Yellow Party was a whig party which played a major role in the politics of Ipswich, Suffolk during the eighteenth century and early nineteenth century. However they were opposed by the Ipswich Blue Party, which were generally aligned with the Tory Party. However the alignment of the local parties with the national parties was eroded as the eighteenth century wore on.

References

Political parties in England
Ipswich
Political history of England